My Lawyer, Mr. Jo is a 2016 South Korean television series starring Park Shin-yang, Kang So-ra, Ryu Soo-young, Park Sol-mi. Based on the same-titled webtoon, it aired on KBS2.

The second season of the drama titled My Lawyer, Mr. Jo 2: Crime and Punishment started airing on KBS2 in January 2019.

Synopsis
Jo Deul-ho (Park Shin-yang) who once had a bright future ahead of him as a star prosecutor, and was the son-in-law to the head of the largest law firm in their country. But when he witnesses corruption in the prosecutor's office and reports it, he loses everything. He tries to rebuild his life and turn his small and run-down neighborhood law office into a second chance to become a lawyer who protects people and protects the law, and grows as a person in the process.

Cast

Main cast
 Park Shin-yang as Jo Deul-ho
 Kang So-ra as Lee Eun-jo
 Ryu Soo-young as Shin Ji-wook
 Park Sol-mi as Jang Hae-kyung, Deul-ho's ex-wife and lawyer at Geum San
 Kim Kap-soo as Shin Young-il, father of Ji-wook

Geum San Law Firm
 Kang Shin-il as Jang Shin-woo
 Jo Han-chul as Kim Tae-jung
 Jung Won-joong as Chairman Jung

Deul-ho's Law Firm
 Hwang Seok-jeong as Hwang Ae-ra
 Park Won-sang as Bae Dae-soo
 Kim Dong-jun as Kim Yoo-shin (Ep. 1-8, 11-12)

Others
 Jung Kyu-soo as Lee Joon-kang
 Kim Ji-an as Oh Seo-yoon
 Jang So-yun as Choi Ah-rim
 Yoon Bok-in as Jung Se-mi
 Choi Jae-hwan as Kang Il-goo
 Jung Han-bi as Oh Jin-young
 Heo Jung-eun as Jo Soo-bin, Deul-ho's daughter
  as Bae Hyo-jin, Dae-soo's younger sister
 Park Sang-myun as Lee Joon-kang
 Lee Yong-yi as Mal-sook

Ratings
In this table,  represent the lowest ratings and  represent the highest ratings.

Awards and nominations

References

External links
 
 
 

Korean-language television shows
2016 South Korean television series debuts
2016 South Korean television series endings
Korean Broadcasting System television dramas
Television shows based on South Korean webtoons
South Korean legal television series
Television series by SM C&C
My Lawyer, Mr. Jo